Rhonard García Ángeles (born September 15, 1990) is a Dominican footballer who plays for local club Cibao FC as a midfielder. He also can play as a fullback in both sides.

Career statistics

Honours
 Cibao
CFU Club Championship (1): 2017

References

External links

1990 births
Living people
People from Espaillat Province
Dominican Republic footballers
Association football midfielders
Liga Dominicana de Fútbol players
Cibao FC players
Dominican Republic international footballers